Avdulovo is a rural locality (a selo) in Voskresensky Selsoviet of Dankovsky District, Lipetsk Oblast, Russia. The population was 150 as of 2010.

Geography 
Avdulovo is located 49 km northwest of Dankov (the district's administrative centre) by road. Pervovka is the nearest rural locality.

References 

Rural localities in Lipetsk Oblast